The Jacksonville Baseball Complex was a baseball diamond that once existed in Jacksonville, TX and was the home of the Jacksonville Jax. The Jacksonville Rodeo Arena now occupies the site. Home plate was in the northwest corner of the square block.

Location
The site of the former ballpark and present-day rodeo arena is situated on the corner of Mulberry and Bridge streets in Jacksonville.

Sources
 "Texas Almanac 2008-2009," The Dallas Morning News, c.2008

References

Baseball venues in East Texas
Baseball venues in Texas
Buildings and structures in Cherokee County, Texas